is a Japanese cross-country skier. He represented Japan at the 2002 Winter Olympics in Salt Lake City, where he competed in the 15 km and the 50 km events.

References

External links
 2002 Japanese Olympic Committee profile 

1974 births
Living people
Cross-country skiers at the 2002 Winter Olympics
Olympic cross-country skiers of Japan
People from Hirosaki
Japanese male cross-country skiers